Grande Chartreuse is the head monastery of the Carthusian religious order.  It is located in the Chartreuse Mountains, north of the city of Grenoble, in the commune of Saint-Pierre-de-Chartreuse (Isère), France.

History

Originally, the château belonged to the See of Grenoble. In 1084, Saint Hugh gave it to hermit Saint Bruno and his followers who founded the Carthusian Order.

The recipe of the alcoholic beverage Chartreuse is said to have been given to the monks of Grande Chartreuse in 1605 by the French Marshal François Annibal d'Estrées. For over a century, the monks worked on perfecting the 130-ingredient recipe. In 1764, the monks expanded their distillery for the first time to meet the demand of their popular Elixir Végétal de la Grande Chartreuse. The distillery has then been moved several times in more remote areas because it represents a major explosion hazard for the surrounding habitations.

The château went through many severe casualties, reconstructions and renovations. The current building was erected in 1688. In 1790, following the French Revolution, the monks were expelled from the monastery, and waited until 1838 to be reauthorized on the premises.

The massive collection of 400 manuscripts and 3500 printed documents (including 300 incunabula) taken from the Grande Chartreuse during the French Revolution is curated and protected in the bibliothèque d’étude et du patrimoine of Grenoble, and an online scanned version of the documents is available on the digital platform of the library, Pagella, for researchers and interested people alike. 

Following the establishment of the Association Law of 1901 and its interpretation that effectively banned religious associations en masse, many notable religious institutions across France, including Grand Chartreuse, were closed by the French government. While some monks found refuge in Italy until 1929, others settled in the Tarragona region of Spain and relaunched the monastery's famous liqueur-producing activity. The Grande Chartreuse was sold in 1927 to a group of local entrepreneurs who invited the monks back to their monastery.

In 1940, the Grande Chartreuse was reopened under the Petain regime. At the end of World War II, the Grand Chartreuse was used as a hospital by the Allied Forces.

Description

Visitors are not permitted at Grand Chartreuse, and motor vehicles are prohibited on the surrounding roads.

A museum of the Carthusian order and the lives of its monks and nuns is located about two kilometers away. The order is supported by the sales of Chartreuse liqueur which has been popular in France and later around the world since the early 18th century. In 2015, the order sold 1.5 million bottles of Chartreuse (50 euros a bottle), and all the proceedings went into financing the order and its charity projects.

In literature
The Italian canon Antonio de Beatis described the former monastery in his 1517-1518 travel journal; he wrote that the original monastery was destroyed in an avalanche long before, killing many of the monks. English poet Matthew Arnold wrote one of his finest poems, "Stanzas from the Grande Chartreuse", while briefly staying at the monastery around 1850.  The quiet, serenity, and monastic calm became, for him, the susurrations of a dying world which contrasted with what he saw as the violent emerging age of machinery. Grand Chartreuse was also described by William Wordsworth in his 1792 Descriptive Sketches (lines 53-73), and in the 1850 revision of The Prelude, Book VI (lines 416-18),  (Wordsworth visited the monastery in 1790, but he describes the 1792 expulsion of the monks by French forces); and John Ruskin's Praeterita.
Alice Muriel Willamson, in her 1905 travel romance novel "The Princess Passes" chapter 28, had her characters visit the recently abandoned monastery, seeing and describing the cells, gardens, and kitchen ware still in place, and described the empty place as a body without a soul.

See also
List of Carthusian monasteries

References

Videography
 Into Great Silence, a documentary directed by Philip Gröning (2005)

External links

 
 Musée de la Grande Chartreuse
 Carthusian Order website

Carthusian monasteries in France
1084 establishments in Europe
1080s establishments in France
Christian monasteries established in the 11th century
Buildings and structures in Isère
Museums in Isère
Religious museums in France